Ivan Aleksandrovich Baklanov (born 16 March 1995) is a Russian football player who plays for Belshina Bobruisk.

Club career
He made his professional debut in the Russian Professional Football League for FC Arsenal-2 Tula on 12 July 2014 in a game against FC Avangard Kursk.

He made his Russian Football National League debut for FC Sokol Saratov on 8 April 2017 in a game against FC Kuban Krasnodar.

References

External links
 
 
 
 

1995 births
Living people
People from Aleksinsky District
Sportspeople from Tula Oblast
Russian footballers
Russia youth international footballers
Association football midfielders
A Lyga players
Russian expatriate footballers
Expatriate footballers in Lithuania
Expatriate footballers in Belarus
FC Sokol Saratov players
PFC CSKA Moscow players
FC Arsenal Tula players
FC Rostov players
FC Urozhay Krasnodar players
FK Palanga players
FC Neman Grodno players
FC Belshina Bobruisk players